Krishnaveni Panjaalai is an Indian Tamil-language romance film written and directed by debutant Dhanapal Padmanabhan, the film has Hemachandran, Nandana, M. S. Bhaskar, Rajiv Krishna and Bala Singh among others in lead roles. The film is set in the backdrop of the 1980s and is about the lives of workers in a cotton mill. Music is by N. R. Raghunanthan of Thenmerku Paruvakaatru fame. The movie is released on 8 June 2012.

Plot
Kadir (Hemachandran) and Poonkothai (Nandana) are cotton mill workers in Udumalaipettai, Tamil Nadu. Their affection grows into love but once the mill closes down following a strike, life gets hard for them and everyone working along with them.

Cast
 Hemachandran as Kathir
 Nandana as Poonkothai
 M. S. Bhaskar
 Rajiv Krishna as Krishnamoorthy
 Bala Singh
 Thennavan
 Shanmugarajan

Soundtrack 

The music was composed by N. R. Raghunanthan.

Release 
The Times of India gave the film a rating of three-and-a-half out of five stars and stated that "Krishnaveni Panjaalai works in parts and could have been more engaging had its screenplay been more tightly knit." A critic from the Hindu wrote that "It is in the screenplay that Dhanapal falters. Scenes end abruptly and stand as separate strands without cohesion". India Today noted that "The climax of the film is very emotional and touches a chord. However, the screenplay could have been better".

References

2012 films
2010s Tamil-language films